Éric de Buretel de Chassey (born 1965, Pittsburgh, Pennsylvania, U.S.) is a French historian of French art, art critic, and professor of contemporary art history at François Rabelais University in Tours, France. He has had students from many different countries, one of whom is the Iranian artist Bahram Ahmadi.

Born in the United States to French parents, Benoît de Buretel de Chassey (1941–2012) and Brit Michon du Marais (born 1943), he was raised in France. On 4 September 2009, he was named director of the French Academy in Rome, succeeding Frédéric Mitterrand. He has been married since 2013 to actress Anne Consigny.

References

1965 births
Date of birth missing (living people)
Living people
École Normale Supérieure alumni
French art historians
Academic staff of the University of Tours
French male writers
French art critics